Terah or Terach ( Teraḥ) is a biblical figure in the Book of Genesis. He is listed as the son of Nahor and father of the patriarch Abraham. As such, he is a descendant of Shem's son Arpachshad. Terah is mentioned in Genesis 11:26–27, Book of Joshua 24:2, and 1 Chronicles 1:17–27 of the Hebrew Bible and Luke 3:34–36 in the New Testament.

Biblical narrative
Terah is mentioned in Genesis 11:26–27, Joshua 24:2, and 1 Chronicles 1:17–27 of the Hebrew Bible and Luke 3:34–36 in the New Testament. Terah is mentioned in Genesis 11:26–32 as a son of Nahor, the son of Serug, descendants of Shem. He is said to have had three sons: Abram (better known by his later name Abraham), Haran, and Nahor II. The family lived in Ur of the Chaldees. One of his grandchildren was Lot, whose father, Haran, had died at Ur.

In the Book of Joshua, in his final speech to the Israelite leaders assembled at Shechem, Joshua recounts the history of God's formation of the Israelite nation, beginning with "Terah the father of Abraham and Nahor, [who] lived beyond the Euphrates River and worshiped other gods." Terah is also mentioned in a biblical genealogy given in 1 Chronicles.

In the Genesis narrative, Terah took his family and left Ur to move to the land of Canaan. Terah set out for Canaan but stopped in the city of Haran along the way, where he died.

Jewish tradition

Children
Genesis 11:26 states that Terah lived 70 years, "and begot Abram, Nahor, and Haran". The Talmud says that Abraham was 52 years old at year 2000 AM (Anno Mundi), which means that he was born in the year 1948 AM.

Occupation
According to rabbinic literature Terah was a wicked (Numbers Rabbah 19:1; 19:33), idolatrous priest (Midrash HaGadol on Genesis 11:28) who manufactured idols (Eliyahu Rabbah 6, and Eliyahu Zuta 25). Abram, in opposition to his father's idol shop, smashed his father's idols and chased customers away. Terah then brought his unruly son before Nimrod, who threw him into a fiery furnace, yet Abram miraculously escaped (Genesis Rabba 38:13). The Zohar says that when God saved Abram from the furnace, Terah repented (Zohar Genesis 1:77b) and Rabbi Abba B. Kahana said that God assured Abram that his father Terah had a portion in the World to Come (Genesis Rabbah 30:4; 30:12).

Rabbi Hiyya relates this account in the Genesis Rabba:

Leader of the journey
Terah is identified as the person who arranged and led the family to embark on a mysterious journey to Canaan. It is shrouded in mystery to Jewish scholars as to why Terah began the journey and as to why the journey ended prematurely. It is suggested that he was a man in search of a greater truth that could possibly be found in the familiar land of Canaan, and that it was Abram who picked up the torch to continue his father's quest, that Terah himself was unable to achieve.

When Abram leaves Haran
In Jewish tradition, when Terah died at age 205, Abraham (70 years younger) was already 135 years old. Abram thus left Haran at age 75, well before Terah died. The Torah, however, relates Terah's death in Haran before Abram continues the journey to Canaan as an expression that he was not remiss in the Mitzvah of honoring a parent by leaving his aging father behind. The significance of Terah not reaching Canaan was a reflection of his character, a man who was unable to go "all the way". Although on a journey in the right direction, Terah fell short at arriving to the divine destination—in contrast to Abram, who did follow through and achieved the divine goal, and was not bound by his father's idolatrous past. Abram's following God's command to leave his father, thus absolved him from the mitzvah of honoring parents, and as Abraham, he would go on to create a new lineage distinct from his ancestors.

Samaritan tradition
In the Samaritan Pentateuch Terah dies aged 145 years and Abram leaves Haran after his death.

Christian tradition
In the Christian tradition Abram left Haran after Terah died. The Christian views of the time of Terah come from a passage in the New Testament at Acts 7:2–4 where Stephen said some things that contrast with Jewish rabbinical views. He said that God appeared to Abraham in Mesopotamia, and directed him to leave the Chaldeans—whereas most rabbinical commentators see Terah as being the one who directed the family to leave Ur Kasdim from Genesis 11:31: "Terah took his son Abram, his daughter-in-law Sarai (his son Abram's wife), and his grandson Lot (his son Haran's child) and left Ur of the Chaldeans to go to the land of Canaan." Stephen asserts that Abram left Haran after Terah died.

Islamic tradition
According to Ibn Kathir, a scholar of Sunni Islam, Abraham's father is believed to have been a disbelieving man, due to his refusal to listen to the constant advice of his son. The earliest story involving Abraham in the Quran is his discussion with his ab (lit. 'father'. The name given for this man in Quran 6:74 is Āzar

As a father, Azar required his son's most sincere advice. Abraham explained to him the faults of idolatry, and why he was wrong to worship objects which could neither hear nor see. From the Quran 74/6, "And [mention, O Muhammad], when Abraham said to his aḇ Azar: Do you take idols as deities? Indeed, I see you and your people to be in manifest error."

Abraham told his father that he had indeed received revelations from God, knowledge which his father did not possess, and told him that belief in God would grant him immense rewards in both this life and the hereafter. Abraham concluded his preaching by warning Azar of the grave punishment he would face if he did not mend his ways. When Abraham offered his father the guidance and advice of God, he rejected it, and threatened to stone him to death. Abraham prayed for his father to be forgiven by God, and although he continued to seek forgiveness, it was only because of a promise that he had made earlier to him. When it became clear that Azar's unrelenting hatred towards monotheism would never be fought, Abraham dissociated himself from him.

The Quran states that the people of Abraham were idolaters. When Abraham was a young boy, he decided to finally teach his community a lesson. He said to himself that he had a plan for their idols, whilst they would be gone away. The Qur'an goes on to narrate that Abraham subsequently broke the idols, all except the largest, which he kept intact. When the people returned, they began questioning each other over the wreckage, until some of the people remembered that the youth, Abraham, had spoken of the idols earlier. When Abraham arrived, the people immediately began to question him, asking him whether he had anything to do with the broken idols. Abraham then, in a clever taunt, asked the people as to why they do not ask the largest of the idols, which, they believed, could indeed hear and speak. The people of Abraham were then confounded with shame, and admitted that the idols were incapable of anything.

After the incident of the idol wreckage, the people of Abraham, while having admitted their fault, are said to have ignored Abraham's warning and instead retaliated by throwing him into a fire and exclaiming "protect your gods". Although the natural nature of fire is one of intense heat, God commanded the flame to be cool and peaceful for Abraham. Abraham, as a result, remained unhurt both physically and spiritually, having survived the fire of persecution. The people continued to taunt and persecute him, but to no avail, as the Qur'an says that it was they "that lost most". This means that Abraham came out unharmed and outstanded people.

In Shia Islam

Terah as Abraham's father
There is a consensus among Shia Muslim scholars and exegetes that Azar was not the biological father of Abraham but rather his paternal uncle while Terah is believed to be his father. Shaykh Tusi maintained that Azar was not Abraham's father and cited a hadith from the Muhammad according to which none of the prophet's ancestors up to Adam were polytheists. By this he argued that since Azar was an idolater and Abraham was one of the prophet's ancestors, it is not possible for Azar to be Abraham's father. According to Grand Ayatollah Naser Makarem Shirazi in Tafsir Nemooneh, all Shiite exegetes and scholars believe that Azar was not Abraham's father. Allamah Tabatabai in his Tafsir al-Mizan appealed to the Quranic verses in which Abraham prayed for his parents, that they show that his father was someone other than Azar. In Dua Umm Dawood, a supplication recited by Shi'ite Muslims cited to be from Imam Ja'far al-Sadiq, the supplicant sends blessings on a person by the name of 'Turakh'. In Nahj al-Balagha, Imam Ali is reported to have said in a sermon, "I testify that Muhammad is His servant and messenger, and the chief of His creation; whenever Allah divided the line of descent, He put him in the better one.." Likewise, in Ziyarat Arbaeen, a recitation with which Shiite Muslims pay respect to Imam Husayn, it is recited "I bear witness that you were a light in the sublime loins and purified wombs..", through which it is believed that none of his ancestors up to Adam were impure, which includes Muhammad, Imam Ali and Lady Fatimah and hence including Abraham's biological father.

The Twelver Shi'ite website Al-Islam.org treats Azar as being Abraham's uncle, not his biological father. To justify this view, it references a passage of the Quran, which mentions that the sons of Yaʿqūb (Jacob) referred to his uncle Ismāʿīl (Ishmael), father Is-ḥāq (Isaac) and grandfather Ibrāhīm (Abraham) as his ābāʾ:

Therefore, the singular word ab does not always mean progenitor, and can be used for an adopter, uncle, step-father, or caretaker, unlike the word wālid (progenitor). Thus, Al-Islam.org denies that Abraham's biological father was 'Azar', and instead agreed with Ibn Kathir that he was the biblical figure 'Terah', who nevertheless treated him as a polytheist.

As Abraham's uncle
In contrast to Al-Islam.org, Shi'ite scholar and jurist Mohammad Taqi al-Modarresi believed Terah to be the uncle of Abraham, not his father.

In popular culture 
Terah is portrayed by Vittorio Gassman in the film Abraham (1993).

References

21st-century BC people
Family of Abraham
Books of Chronicles people
Book of Joshua
Gospel of Luke
Noach (parashah)
Ur of the Chaldees
Harran